Events in the year 2019 in the Dominican Republic.

Incumbents
 President: Danilo Medina
 Vice President: Margarita Cedeño de Fernández

Events
 9 June – Shooting of David Ortiz in Santo Domingo Este

Deaths
7 January – Alanna Lockward, curator, writer and filmmaker (b. 1961).

28 January – Yoskar Sarante, bachata singer (b. 1970).

12 March – Alberto Lois, baseball player (b. 1956).

20 April – Braulio Lara, baseball player (b. 1988).

References

 
Years of the 21st century in the Dominican Republic
Dominican Republic
Dominican Republic